WBP may refer to:

West Bengal Police, one of the two police forces of the Indian state of West Bengal
West Brompton station, London, National Rail station code
Western Block Party, a defunct Canadian federal political party
White Boy Posse, a Canadian white supremacist neo-Nazi organized crime group
Weather and Boil Proof (WBP) glue, glue used for marine plywood fabrication